Get Saved is the second full-length album of Pilot to Gunner.

Track listing
"Get Saved"  (3:46) 
"Metropolitans"  (2:35) 
"The Product"  (3:06) 
"Hey Carrier"  (3:43) 
"Sorry Names"  (4:03) 
"Barrio Superstarrio"  (2:55) 
"No-Blooded"  (3:48) 
"Hot Circuitry"  (2:40) 
"Downstate"  (3:56)
"Dry Ice & Strobe Lights"  (3:51) 
"Sound Recovery"  (3:07)

References

External links
Arena Rock Recording Co.

2004 albums
Pilot to Gunner albums
Arena Rock Recording Company albums